Vermist is a Dutch language crime drama produced by Belgian broadcaster VT4 and Dutch production company Eyeworks. It is broadcast on VT4 in Flanders and on Fox in the Netherlands. A French dubbed version called Urgence disparitions is broadcast on W9.

Based on the characters and background of the successful Flemish film , the first episode was broadcast on March 25, 2008. A second season was broadcast in 2010.

External links
  
 

Flemish television shows
Belgian drama television shows
2008 Belgian television series debuts
Play4 (TV channel) original programming